The Young Pioneers was a trial-run ABC western television series about young newlyweds who settle in the Dakota Territory during the 1870s. If the first three episodes had received good ratings the series may have found a place on the network’s fall lineup.

The series was based on the plot of Rose Wilder Lane’s 1933 novel Let the Hurricane Roar, which was reissued as  Young Pioneers though the main characters names came from her novel Free Land.

In March 1975 the television film Young Pioneers was watched by 40  million viewers, so in December 1975 a second film Young Pioneers' Christmas  continued the story of homesteaders Molly and David Beaton, and served as a pilot for a planned ABC series. The Young Pioneers series aired on Sundays at 7 p.m. The first episode was a two-hour movie, followed by two sixty-minute episodes.

Cast
Linda Purl  as Molly Beaton, newly married homesteader
Roger Kern as David Beaton, newly married homesteader
Robert Hays as Dan Gray, neighboring homesteader 
Robert Donner as Mr. Peters, neighboring homesteader 
Mare Winningham as Nettie Peters, daughter of Mr. Peters
Michelle Stacy as Flora Peters, daughter of Mr. Peters 
Jeff Cotler as Charlie Peters, son of Mr. Peters

Production
The series’ exterior scenes were filmed on the Empire Ranch, near Sonoita, Arizona, with interior shots filmed at the 20th Century-Fox studios in Hollywood. Four sod structures were built for the series, with a house and a barn in both Arizona and California. 

Ed Friendly, who had earlier produced the two-hour pilot film for NBCs Little House on the Prairie, was The Young Pioneers producer. Earl Hamner, creator of The Waltons, was brought in to help with the project. He wanted the series to progress like a novel, with each episode to be a single chapter, and the audience seeing the progression of the nearest town of Wildrose.

Episodes

References

External links 
 

1970s American television miniseries
1970s Western (genre) television series
1970s American drama television series
1978 American television series debuts
1978 American television series endings
American Broadcasting Company original programming
Christian entertainment television series
Television shows based on American novels